Gorecki or Górecki (feminine: Gorecka or Górecka) is a Polish-language surname, also distorted as Goretzki, Goretzka, Gurecki, Gurecka. It may refer to:

People
 Adam Devlin (born as Adam Tadek Gorecki 1969), English musician
 Agnieszka Górecka, Polish biologist and 2019 Ig Nobel Prize winner
 Antoni Gorecki (1787–1861), Polish poet and author
 Emelia Gorecka (born 1994), British runner
 Haley Gorecki (born 1996), American basketball player
 Halina Górecka (born 1938), Polish-German sprinter
 Henryk Górecki (1933–2010), Polish composer
 Kazimierz Górecki (1954–1977), Polish sprint canoer
 Leon Goretzka (born 1995), German footballer
 Maria Kazanecka-Górecka (born 1955), Polish sprint canoer 
 Martin Gorecki (1871–1928), American politician
 Mikołaj Górecki (born 1971), Polish composer
 Reid Gorecki (born 1980), American baseball outfielder
 Rick Gorecki (born 1973), American baseball pitcher
 Tadeusz Gorecki (1825–1868), Polish painter
 Viola Goretzki (born 1956), German rower
  (born 2000), Polish volleyball player; see

Other uses
 Górecki (song), a 1997 single by Lamb from their debut album Lamb
 Mount Gorecki, a mountain in the Schmidt Hills of the Neptune Range of the Pensacola Mountains, Antarctica
 Kalina Górecka, a village in Świętokrzyskie Voivodeship, in south-central Poland
 Wola Górecka, a village in Podkarpackie Voivodeship, in south-eastern Poland

See also
 

Polish-language surnames